NSÍ Runavík is a Faroese football club, playing in Runavík on the island of Eysturoy. It was founded 24 March 1957. In 2003 NSÍ participated for the first time on a European stage.

In 2007, the club won the Faroe Islands Premier League for the first time.

The club has won the Faroe Islands Cup in 1986, 2002 and 2017. Aside from these instances, NSÍ Runavík featured in the 1980, 1985, 1988, 2004 and 2015 tournament finals.

The club plays in yellow and black. Their stadium (Við Løkin) has a capacity of 2,000. It is not approved by UEFA for international play, so Runavík play their UEFA Europa League matches at Tórsvøllur in Tórshavn or Svangaskarð in Toftir. The main sponsor of NSÍ is BORG, which is based in Runavík near Bakkafrost which is the largest salmon-farming company in the Faroe Islands. It is one of the biggest private employers in the islands, if not the biggest.

Achievements 
Faroe Islands Premier League: 1
 2007
Faroe Islands Cup: 3
 1986, 2002, 2017
Faroe Islands Super Cup: 1
 2008
Faroe Islands second tier (1. deild since 2005): 5
 1978, 1983, 1990, 1993, 1996

Current squad 
As of 28 September 2021

European record

Overview

Matches

Notes
 1R: First round
 QR: Qualifying round
 PR: Preliminary round
 1Q: First qualifying round

Managers 

  Abraham Løkin (1984)
  Asbjørn Mikkelsen (1984)
  Abraham Løkin (1986)
  Poli Justinussen (1987)
  Kim Truesen (1988)
  Bobby Bolton (January 1991 – May 92)
  Trygvi Mortensen (May 1992 – December 92)
  Petur Simonsen (January 1994 – December 94)
  January 85 – Nov 85Ian Salter (January 1995 – July 95)
  Meinhard Dalbúð &  Jógvan Nordbúð (August 1995 – December 95)
  Petur Mohr (January 1997 – December 98)
  Milan Cimburovic (January 1999 – April 99)
  Trygvi Mortensen (May 1999 – December 00)
  Petur Mohr (January 2001 – 1 December)
  Jógvan Martin Olsen (January 2002 – 4 December)
  Trygvi Mortensen (January 2005 – 6 August)
  Arnfinn Langgaard &  Bogi Lervig (Sept 2006 – 6 December)
  Jóhan Nielsen (1 January 2007 – 31 December 2008)
  Pauli Poulsen (1 January 2009 – 31 December 2011)
  Kári Reynheim (1 January 2012 – 31 December 2012)
  Abraham Løkin (1 January 2013 – 30 June 2013)
  Heðin Askham (1 July 2013 – 31 December 2013)
  Trygvi Mortensen (1 January 2014 – 31 December 2015)
  Anders Gerber (1 January 2016 – 6 October 2017)
  Sámal Erik Hentze (2 November  2017 – 2 November 2018)
  Guðjón Þórðarson (3 November  2018 – 29 November 2019)
  Glenn Ståhl (29 October 2019 – 29 September 2020)
  Allan K. Jepsen (24 October 2020  – 28 Jul 2021)
  Bill McLeod Jacobsen (4 August 2021 - )

Top tier scorer

References

External links 

 Official Website
 Guliganz Fan Club
 Bakkafrost – the main sponsor of NSÍ Runavík FC

 
Association football clubs established in 1957
1957 establishments in the Faroe Islands